Ryūzō, Ryuzo or Ryuuzou (written: , , ,  or ) is a masculine Japanese given name. Notable people with the name include:

, Japanese footballer and manager
, Japanese voice actor
, Japanese footballer
, Japanese writer
, Japanese politician
, Japanese military leader
, Japanese footballer
, Japanese anthropologist, ethnologist and folklorist
, Japanese scientist

Fictional characters
 Ryuzo, a character in Ghost of Tsushima, played by actor Leonard Wu

Japanese masculine given names